The Hammond Calumet Buccaneers were a professional team of basketball that competed in the National Basketball League for only the 1948–49 season. They were based in Hammond, Indiana, and played in the Hammond Civic Center for home games.

The team ranked third in the Eastern Division, and was eliminated in the first round of the playoffs by the Syracuse Nationals.

References

 
Basketball teams established in 1948
Sports clubs disestablished in 1949
1948 establishments in Indiana
1949 disestablishments in Indiana